Corey Whelan (born 10 December 1997) is a professional footballer who plays as a defender for League Two side Carlisle United. Born in England, he has represented the Republic of Ireland at youth level.

Club career

Liverpool
Whelan began his youth career at Crewe Alexandra when he was signed by Liverpool F.C aged 9 in 2007. He made his Liverpool under-18 debut against Manchester United, with the team winning 4–0. He then became a regular starter of the club's under-23 team and team captain.  He signed a new contract with the club in December 2017.

Loans to Yeovil Town and Crewe Alexandra
On 5 January 2018, Whelan joined League Two club Yeovil Town on loan until the end of the season. He made his debut for Yeovil against Bradford City in the FA Cup third round, on 6 January 2018. He scored his first senior goal against Fleetwood Town in the EFL Trophy on 6 February 2018.

On 31 August 2018, he joined Crewe on loan until January 2019. After under-21s international call-ups, he made his Crewe debut playing at right-back in a 0–0 draw at Cheltenham Town on 15 September 2018. He scored his first goal for Crewe at Gresty Road in a 2–0 win over Grimsby Town on 27 October 2018.

He was released by Liverpool at the end of the 2018–19 season.

Phoenix Rising
On 15 July 2019, Whelan joined USL Championship side Phoenix Rising FC.

Wigan Athletic
On 22 January 2021, Whelan joined League One side Wigan Athletic on a permanent deal until the end of the 2020-21 season. He made 10 appearances at his time at Wigan, helping the club avoid the drop to league 2, despite being in administration .

Carlisle United
On 23 June 2021, Whelan agreed to join Carlisle United on two-year deal following the expiry of his contract at Wigan.

International career
Having previously played for Ireland at youth level, he received his first Republic of Ireland under-21 cap in a match against Kosovo on 25 March 2017.

Career statistics

References

1996 births
Living people
People from Chester
Republic of Ireland association footballers
Republic of Ireland youth international footballers
Republic of Ireland under-21 international footballers
English footballers
English people of Irish descent
Association football central defenders
Liverpool F.C. players
Yeovil Town F.C. players
English Football League players
Crewe Alexandra F.C. players
Phoenix Rising FC players
Wigan Athletic F.C. players
Carlisle United F.C. players
FC Tucson players
USL League One players
USL Championship players